Vindy Lee (born 23 November 1983 in Jakarta, Indonesia) is an Indonesian celebrity chef, TV personality and cookbook author of the Sexy Food , Food Lover  & The Best Indonesian Recipes of Professional Chefs in 2022.  Known as the "Viral Chef" of Indonesia, her etiquette and table manners skills has gained popularity throughout various social media platforms. In June 2022, her menu has been featured in Westin Hotel, Jakarta. She previously hosted several television shows including her own cooking show, Sexy Food, on Transvision (Indonesia); a ready meal food delivery project in Jakarta, which features her signature Beauty Secret Meals

Lee started her professional cooking career in 2004, as sous chef in Champagne French Cafe and Bakery in Beverly Hills, California. Her experience extended to Rosti Italian Restaurant in Westlake Village, California, before venturing to become a personal chef.

In 2012-2014 Lee represented Jakarta for Enjoy Jakarta Festivals as chef in Singapore, California, and Taiwan where she prepared authentic Indonesian food for hundreds of notable figures.

Lee also hosted several cooking shows on Indonesia's MetroTV, Trans 7, and RCTI, and a food explorations show on AnTV Indonesia.

Lee was also FHM Indonesia's Top 100 Sexiest Women 2015 for the 5th year. She has been featured in several international magazines, including 10 international FHM features, Maxim, and appeared on the cover of Nepal's Food & Wine magazine in August 2009. She has appeared several times in the "Top 100 Sexiest Women" lists of FHM Romania and FHM Indonesia. 2011, 2012 and 2013. Lee has been considered one of the "Top Five Sexiest Women of Indonesia" since 2012.

Biography
Vindy Lee was raised with two siblings in Jakarta, Indonesia. At the age of 7, she moved to Singapore to attend primary and high school. In 1999, she moved to Los Angeles, briefly attending Santa Monica College before transferring to the University of Southern California, where she graduated with a Bachelor of Arts degree, double majoring in International relations and East Asian language and culture.

Cooking career
After her graduation from USC, Lee took a string of restaurant positions, including cook at an art school cafe in downtown Los Angeles, sous chef at a French cafe in Beverly Hills, California, cocktail waitress at McCormick & Schmick's seafood restaurant, and a managerial position in Rosti Italian Restaurant at Westlake Village, California. Ultimately, Lee decided to pursue her culinary career as a full-time personal chef.

In 2012 Lee represented Jakarta in the "Enjoy Jakarta" cultural event at the W Hotel Los Angeles, Hollywood and W Hotel San Francisco, California in liaison with the Indonesian Consulate General, preparing Indonesian food in the prestigious W Hotels for notable VIPs and political delegates. This was also held in 2013 in Singapore, and 2014 at the Grand Hyatt Hotel Taipei.

Vindy Lee also serves as a board member of Indonesian Chef Association since 2017.

Cookbook author
Lee published her first cookbook, Sexy Food, in November 2010. Published by Gramedia Pustaka Utama, the book contains recipes inspired by Lee's experiences as a professional chef, presented in a sensual and artistic manner. Her second book, published 2017 entitled Food Lover, is currently available for loan in Singapore National Library and available for sale in Indonesia bookstores. In 2022, Lee wrote her first bilingual cookbook entitled The Best Recipes of Indonesian Professional Chefs. The book - in English and Indonesian, is available for sale at Gramedia Indonesia

Modeling
In September 2007, after returning to Jakarta, Lee was "found" by a photographer at the Plaza Indonesia Mall. She was offered a feature in the first issue of Male Emporium Asia magazine, and has subsequently appeared on the covers of a number of Indonesian magazines, as well as international publications of MAXIM and FHM (featured in Singapore, Indonesia, Malaysia, India, Romania). Lee also won the title of MAXIM Indonesias "Hometown Hottie" 2009, Esquire Indonesia November 2017, and was featured on the cover of FHM Malaysia in November 2010 and Wanita Indonesia in April 2012.

TV personality
Lee hosts her own cooking show, Sexy Food, on Transvision (Indonesia), adapted from her cookbook. She has been cooking on Indonesian national TV since 2010. She is a food critic for such shows as Jakarta Belum Tidur on AnTV. Lee has appeared regularly in DahSyat show RCTI as chef. Lee also hosted her own cooking segment, "Dapur Cantik" on Trans 7 as chef. Lee appeared as chef on several episodes of the live 811 Show of MetroTV. She hosted the "Taste of Indonesia" segment on Indonesia Now of MetroTV with Executive Chef Vindex Tengker of Four Seasons Hotels and Resorts Jakarta.

Ready Meal Delivery Service
On May 2017, Lee started her ready meal food delivery service in Jakarta. Lee features her signature Beauty Secret Meals with all-natural recipes for maintaining weight and healthy body, along with her line of beauty supplement drinks.

Viral Chef of Indonesia 
In 2022, Lee has been coined the "Viral Chef of Indonesia" due to her immensely popular social media presence. Her table manners video on eating Nasi Padang with British Formal Dining etiquette has gathered over 50 millions views across various social media platforms. Lee shares tips on table manners, social etiquette and culinary hacks. Her viral videos include eating traditional Indonesian cuisine Nasi Padang, Indonesian Baso, Mie Ayam, street food like Pecel Lele; and kitchen hacks on how to open "Salak" snake skin fruit has raised tens of millions of views across several social media platforms

References

External links
 Official website of Vindy Lee
 Official website of Vindy Lee Beauty Secret Ready Meals

Living people
Indonesian female models
People from Jakarta
Indonesian people of Chinese descent
Indonesian television personalities
Indonesian chefs
1983 births